The following is a list of awards and nominations received by American actress and comedian Amy Schumer. Schumer is known for her performances in film, television and theatre, and for her comedy albums and specials.

Schumer has received thirteen Primetime Emmy Award nominations, winning in 2015 for Outstanding Variety Sketch Series for Inside Amy Schumer. For her film work, she received a Golden Globe Award for Best Actress – Motion Picture Comedy or Musical nomination for her performance in the Judd Apatow comedy Trainwreck (2015). In 2017, she earned two Grammy Award nominations for Best Comedy Album for Amy Schumer: Live at the Apollo and for Best Spoken Word Album for The Girl with the Lower Back Tattoo. For her work on stage, she earned a Tony Award for Best Actress in a Play nomination for her role in Steve Martin's comedic play Meteor Shower in 2018.

Major associations

Emmy Awards

Golden Globe Awards

Grammy Awards

Tony Awards

Miscellaneous awards

References 

Schumer, Amy